Alliance Rubber Company is an American manufacturer of natural rubber bands, as well as other elastomer products made of synthetic rubber, silicone rubber, thermoplastic, and EPDM (Ethylene Propylene Diene Monomer). The company was originally located in Alliance, Ohio, but is now headquartered in Hot Springs, AR. It was founded by William H. Spencer in 1923, and sells its products to commercial stationers, newspapers, produce growers, commercial fishermen, the United States government, post offices, retailers, promotional products industry, and industrial packaging houses.

Alliance's 2,200 products are available in 65 countries worldwide.

History

Early Years in Alliance, OH 
Originally, Alliance rubber bands were made from cutting rejected rubber inner tubes. Mr Spencer took the bands to Akron Beacon Journal and persuaded them to wrap their newspapers with a band to prevent them from coming apart and blowing across lawns.

1944 to Present Day in Hot Springs, Arkansas 
Alliance went on to expand its business in 1944 with an additional production plant in Hot Springs, AR. Alliance patented the Open-Ring® style rubber band in 1957, and invented a slide dispenser pack for mass markets, a perforated desk and open window box in 1959. They developed the first zip bands for postal use in 1966 and installed the world's first continuous cure rubber band production line in 1969.

 

In March 2020, Alliance announced that they would retool their manufacturing facility to create products (such as Rubber Strips) used to manufacture personal protective equipment (PPE) to mitigate the COVID-19 pandemic. The first shipment provided over 134,000 PPE devices to healthcare workers in Michigan as well as the NYPD. As a result of these efforts, the company was awarded the Governor's Award for Excellence in Global Trade. 

Presently, Alliance Rubber Company owns the url RubberBand.com and as of January 2022 they are the only manufacturer of rubber bands in the United States.

In April 2021, Alliance announced the release of the first fully tested and approved automated banding machine for seafood. The machine is primarily used for banding lobster claws at catch as well as banding oysters for further processing.

In October 2021, The Arkansas District Export Council  announced Alliance Rubber Company as one of six winners of the 2021 Governor's Award for Excellence in Global Trade. The award recognizes exporters who "through the innovative and thoughtful development of the export market were able to successfully overcome the economic impacts of the 2020 pandemic and retain at least 95% of their workforce."

In January 2022, the engineers at Alliance Rubber Company formulated a new EPDM formula in response to the global supply-chain disruptions following the COVID-19 pandemic. The new formula offers the same performance capabilities but from a domestic source. This formula was then used to create EPDM Anchor Bands for the Agricultural and Electronics Industry.

References 

 "Alliance Rubber Company Stretches Its Creativity", PPB Mag, December, 2003.
 "Alliance Rubber Co.", University of Wisconsin School of Business.
 "Alliance Rubber Company Launches New Scented Study Aids", "PRWeb", April 12, 2011.

External links 
 Official website
 Official website for ARCO® Silicone

Office supply companies of the United States
Companies based in Ohio